In baseball statistics, total bases is the number of bases a player gains with hits. It is a weighted sum with values of 1 for a single, 2 for a double, 3 for a triple and 4 for a home run. For example, three singles is three total bases, while a double and a home run is six total bases.

Only bases attained from hits count toward this total. Reaching base by other means (such as a base on balls) or advancing further after the hit (such as when a subsequent batter gets a hit) does not increase the player's total bases. In box scores and other statistical summaries, total bases is often denoted by the abbreviation TB.

The total bases divided by the number of at bats is the player's slugging percentage.

Records

Hank Aaron's 6,856 career total bases make him the all-time MLB record holder. Having spent the majority of his career playing in the National League, he also holds that league's record with 6,591 total bases. Aaron hit for 300 or more total bases in a record 15 different seasons. Aaron regarded this record as his proudest accomplishment, over his career home run record, because he felt it better reflected his performance as a team player. Ty Cobb's 5,854 total bases constitute the American League record. Albert Pujols is the active leader and 2nd all-time with 6,144 total bases, as of August 22 of the 2022 MLB season.

The single season MLB and American League records are held by Babe Ruth, who hit for 457 TB in the 1921 season. The following season saw Rogers Hornsby set the National League record when he hit for 450 total bases.

Shawn Green holds the single game total bases record of 19 TB. Green hit four home runs, a single and a double for the Los Angeles Dodgers against the Milwaukee Brewers on May 23, 2002. The equivalent American League record is held by Josh Hamilton, who hit four home runs and a double (18 TB) for the Texas Rangers in a May 8, 2012, game versus the Baltimore Orioles.

Dustin Pedroia collected the most total bases in a single interleague game during the regular season, with 15. Pedroia hit three home runs, a single and a double for the Boston Red Sox on June 24, 2010, in a game against the Colorado Rockies at Coors Field.

The 2003 Boston Red Sox and 2019 Minnesota Twins jointly hold the American League single season team record with 2,832 total bases; the National League record is held by the 2001 Colorado Rockies (2,748 TB). The Red Sox also have the record for most total bases by a team in one game: they hit for 60 TB in a 29–4 victory over the St. Louis Browns on June 8, 1950.

Among major league pitchers, Phil Niekro gave up the most total bases in a career (7,473), while Robin Roberts (555 TB allowed in 1956) holds the single season record. The record number of total bases allowed in a single game by one pitcher is 42, by Allan Travers of the Detroit Tigers.

Postseason
Two players have hit for 14 total bases in a postseason game. Albert Pujols is the only player to accomplish this in the World Series, doing so for the St. Louis Cardinals in Game 3 of the 2011 World Series, when he had two singles and three home runs. Bob Robertson also achieved the feat while playing for the Pittsburgh Pirates in Game 2 of the 1971 National League Championship Series, with a double and three home runs. David Freese holds the record for a single postseason, with 50 total bases during the 2011 playoffs for the St. Louis Cardinals, while Derek Jeter has the career postseason record of 302 total bases, all with the New York Yankees.

The Boston Red Sox hit for 45 total bases in their 23–7 victory over the Cleveland Indians in Game 4 of the 1999 American League Division Series, a postseason record. The most total bases by a team in a World Series game is 34, by the Atlanta Braves in Game 5 of the 1991 World Series, when they beat the Minnesota Twins by a score of 14–5.

All-Star Games
Ted Williams hit for a record 10 total bases (two singles and two home runs) in the All-Star Game when representing the American League in the 1946 edition. The 1954 edition, when the American League had 29 and the National League had 23, produced the most total bases in a single All-Star Game, 52. The most total bases by one team in an All-Star Game is 29, achieved by the American League in both the 1954 and 1992 editions. The National League had a high of 25 total bases in the 1951 game.

References

External links
Total Bases Records at Baseball Almanac

Baseball statistics